Events in the year 1960 in Bulgaria.

Incumbents 

 General Secretaries of the Bulgarian Communist Party: Todor Zhivkov
 Chairmen of the Council of Ministers: Todor Zhivkov

Events 

 July 20 – Po sveta i u nas, the flagship Bulgarian news program aired each day on the Bulgarian public television channel BNT 1 and the flagship channel of Bulgarian National Television (BNT), aired it's pilot episode.

Sports 

 June 3–11 – The 1960 European Women's Basketball Championship was held in Sofia. The Soviet Union won the gold medal, Bulgaria won the silver medal, and Czechoslovakia won the bronze medal.

References 

 
1960s in Bulgaria
Years of the 20th century in Bulgaria
Bulgaria
Bulgaria